The I. W. Goodner House is a historic house located at 216 E. Prospect Avenue in Pierre, South Dakota. The house, one of the oldest in Pierre, was built between 1881 and 1885 for I. W. Goodner, the first clerk of the South Dakota Supreme Court. While the house was built with a Gothic Revival design, Goodner remodeled the house in the 1900s, converting it to a Colonial Revival home. The renovated house featured a new second story and attic and a wraparound porch supported by Tuscan columns.

The house was added to the National Register of Historic Places on March 23, 1995.

See also
 List of the oldest buildings in North Dakota

References

Houses on the National Register of Historic Places in South Dakota
Colonial Revival architecture in South Dakota
Houses in Pierre, South Dakota
National Register of Historic Places in Pierre, South Dakota